Tim Wulff (born 20 June 1987) is a German footballer who plays as a centre-forward for Weiche Flensburg II.

Career
Wulff made his professional debut in the 3. Liga for Holstein Kiel on 25 July 2009, coming on as a substitute in the 71st minute for Francky Sembolo in a 2–0 away loss against Jahn Regensburg.

References

External links
 
 

1987 births
Living people
People from Schleswig, Schleswig-Holstein
Footballers from Schleswig-Holstein
German footballers
Association football forwards
Holstein Kiel II players
Holstein Kiel players
SC Weiche Flensburg 08 players
3. Liga players
Regionalliga players